Whirlow Brook Park is a landscaped garden of 39 acres in Whirlow, Sheffield, which are open to the public, containing Whirlow Brook Hall. It stretches from Ecclesall Road and joins on to Limb Brook Valley heading towards the Peak District, with an entrance to Whinfell Quarry Garden.

History 

Whirlow Brook Hall was built in 1906 by Percy Fawcett, a director of Thomas Firth & Sons, with an elevated terrace giving fine views over Ecclesall Woods to Abbeydale. In 1920 the house was sold to his sister, Lily Marguerite 'Madge', who was married to Sir Walter Benton Jones, the son of a baronet and chairman/managing director of the United Steel Companies. They were keen gardeners and working with the Royal Horticultural Society along with six staff developed the grounds to include a Japanese rock garden, shrubberies and the lakes.

Lady Jones died in 1938 and was buried in the grounds. Sir Walter moved to the family seat at Irnham Hall, Lincolnshire. In 1946 the house along with 39 acres of grounds was sold to a consortium, which included the Town Trustees, the J.G. Graves Charitable Trust and Sheffield Corporation, for £15,000; the grave of Lady Jones was moved. The grounds were opened to the public in 1951 as Whirlow Brook Park.

The house is now a venue for weddings, conferences and events. There are plans to open a café to replace the one that closed in 2012.

There is a Friends of Whirlow Brook Park set up in 2021 to help fund the restoration of the gardens and a new shelter erected in the  Commemorative Garden.

References

External links 
 Friends of Whirlow Brook Park
 Friends of Whirlow Brook Park (facebook)

Parks in Sheffield